Fiona Ferro (born 12 March 1997) is a French professional tennis player born in Belgium.

Ferro has won two singles titles on the WTA Tour and four singles titles on the ITF Circuit. She has career-high WTA rankings of No. 39 in singles, attained on 8 March 2021, and No. 257 in doubles, reached on 17 May 2021. She’s sponsored by Lacoste, Yonex and WellJob.

Personal life
Ferro was born in Libramont, Belgium, to a Belgian mother, Catherine, and a French-Italian father, Fabrizio. Ferro's parents owned a restaurant in Belgium when she was born. The Ferros moved to southern France when Fiona was one year old. As of 2018, Fiona's parents were the owners of two hotels in Valbonne, France. Fiona has two older brothers, Gianni and Paolo, and one younger brother, Flavio. Fiona started playing tennis when she was seven in her hometown of Valbonne.

In 2022, Ferro pressed charges against former coach Pierre Bouteyre for alleged rape and sexual assault that took place when she was aged between 15 and 18 years old.

Career

Junior

Ferro was the national girls' champion of France in the 12-13 year-old, 15-16 year-old and 17-18 year-old categories. She had a career-high ITF junior combined ranking of world No. 27, attained on 3 June 2013.

2012-2016
Ferro made her ITF Women's Circuit debut at the $25k indoor hardcourt tournament held in late January 2012 in Grenoble, France; she only entered that tournament's singles event, losing in the first qualifying round. She played (only in the singles events of) eight tournaments on the 2012 ITF Circuit.

She played (only in the singles events of) eleven tournaments on the 2013 ITF Circuit. Her 2013 year-end WTA singles ranking was world No. 557, compared to world No. 1062 on 11 February 2013.

Ferro made her WTA Tour singles debut at the 2014 Internationaux de Strasbourg; as a wildcard, she lost in the first qualifying round to Yuliya Beygelzimer.

She made her Grand Slam singles debut at the 2014 French Open, after receiving a wildcard for the singles main draw, where she lost in the first round to the No. 16 seed Sabine Lisicki.

In June 2016, Ferro ended her player-coach collaboration with Pierre Bouteyre. He had been her coach since 2010.

Ferro then made her WTA 125K series singles debut at the Open de Limoges, after receiving a wildcard for the main draw wherein she lost in the first round to the unseeded Ivana Jorović.

2017
At the end of February, Ferro played her year-first and just her third career WTA Tour singles main-draw match at the Mexican Open after defeating two higher-ranked players (Samantha Crawford and Tatjana Maria) in qualifying matches, losing in the first round to the No. 5 seed Christina McHale. In April, Ferro played her second and third WTA Tour singles main-draw matches of 2017 in Bogotá and Istanbul respectively, after winning two qualifying matches in each tournament; she lost in the first round to seeded players (to Johanna Larsson in Bogotá and Sorana Cîrstea in Istanbul) in both tournaments.

At the end of 2017, Ferro packed up and moved to Paris to train at the Centre National d'Entraînement (CNE) to take advantage of the very good facilities there. Her tennis coach was Stéphane Huet and she also had a fitness coach and a mental coach that she shared with other players training at the CNE.

2018
On 11 February, Ferro won her first ITF singles title in Grenoble. She had to win three qualifying matches to reach the singles main-draw of a WTA Tour event for the first time in 2018, at the International tournament in Rabat, losing in the first round to another qualifier, Paula Badosa Gibert. Ferro also played in Strasbourg, where she had entered the singles main draw as a wildcard, losing in the first round to the sixth seed Tímea Babos.

Ferro received a singles main-draw wildcard for the French Open, just like she did in 2014, 2015 and 2017. She won the first Grand Slam singles main-draw match of her career and also picked up her first career win over a player ranked in the top 100 at the French Open when she defeated world No. 61, Carina Witthöft, in the first round. She lost to the No. 3 seed Garbiñe Muguruza in the second round.

On 22 October 2018, Ferro attained a career-high of world No. 100 in the WTA singles rankings and became the 43rd Frenchwoman to break inside the top 100 of those rankings.

2019: First WTA title

In early February, Ferro was selected for the first time in the France Fed Cup team, for the Fed Cup World Group quarterfinal against Belgium. She played only the doubles match (partnering Pauline Parmentier), which was a dead rubber, of that tie which France won 3–1. She and Parmentier lost their match against Ysaline Bonaventure and Kirsten Flipkens in three sets. 

In July, Ferro won her first career WTA Tour singles title in Lausanne, beating defending champion, Alizé Cornet, in the final.

On 18 December 2019, Ferro announced on her Instagram account that Emmanuel Planque would henceforth be her new coach. Her two-year player-coach collaboration with Stéphane Huet had ended at the end of October 2019.

2020: Second WTA title, top 50 debut
On 9 August, Ferro won her second WTA Tour title, defeating Anett Kontaveit in the final of the Palermo Open. This was the first tournament since the tour had shut down due to the coronavirus pandemic.

Ferro reached the fourth round of the French Open, her best showing at a Grand Slam tournament in her career thus far, where she was defeated by fourth seeded and eventual runner-up, Sofia Kenin.

Ferro finished the year in the top 50 at No. 42 for the first time in her career.

2021: Australian Open third round, Top 40

Ferro reached the third round of the Australian Open, her best showing at this Grand Slam event in her career so far, where she was defeated by 15th seed Iga Świątek. She reached a career-high of No. 39 on 8 March 2021. 
After that, her season was plagued by injuries, including one in April that forced her to retire from her quarterfinal in Istanbul, and then one (foot) before Roland-Garros. She still managed to deliver, despite the loss, a great fight against Jennifer Brady (13th at the time) in the second round though (4-6, 6-2, 5-7).
After a winningless grass-court season, Ferro came back on clay and reached the quarterfinals in Lausanne, beaten by Clara Burel (7-5, 6-2). Beaten in the second round of the Olympic Games in Tokyo by Sara Sorribes Tormo (6-1, 6-4), Ferro came close to upset Iga Świątek in the second round of the US Open: she was up 6-3, 2-0 but lost 6-3, 6-7, 0-6.

Ferro then reached the semifinals of the ITF tournament of Santa Fe in California, where she retired in the third set against Elvina Kalieva (6-4, 4-6, 0-3). During her last two events of the year, she lost against the Canadian Françoise Abanda (6-4, 4-6, 4-6) in the Billie Jean King Cup Finals, and then against Aliaksandra Sasnovich (2-6, 6-3, 2-6) in the first round in Linz.

Performance timelines

Only main-draw results in WTA Tour, Grand Slam tournaments, Fed Cup/Billie Jean King Cup and Olympic Games are included in these records.

Singles
Current through the 2022 French Open

Doubles

WTA career finals

Singles: 2 (2 titles)

ITF Circuit finals

Singles: 10 (5 titles, 5 runner–ups)

Notes

References

External links
 
 
 

1997 births
Living people
French female tennis players
French people of Belgian descent
French people of Italian descent
People from Libramont-Chevigny
Competitors at the 2018 Mediterranean Games
Mediterranean Games silver medalists for France
Mediterranean Games medalists in tennis
Olympic tennis players of France
Tennis players at the 2020 Summer Olympics
21st-century French women